Trick (stylized as TRICK) is the seventh studio album released by J-pop singer-songwriter Kumi Koda. The album continued her No. 1 streak and stayed on the Oricon charts for twenty-nine weeks. It was released on January 28, 2009, and came in CD and CD+2DVD with the latter being a limited edition and the second DVD containing her Live DVD "Koda Kumi Special Live "Dirty Ballroom" ~One Night Show~".  The limited editions of both versions carried the bonus track "Venus," originally released by Shocking Blue in 1969.

Information
Trick is Kumi Koda's seventh studio album and eleventh overall album. It continued her streak of No. 1 albums on the weekly Oricon Albums Charts, which began in 2005 with her compilation album Best ~first things~. Trick debuted at No. 1 on Oricon's Daily Chart with over 100,000 units sold in its first day. By the end of its first week, Trick sold over 253,000 copies, placing it at No. 1 on charts, being her third album to reach the top spot. However, it was one of her lowest first week sales for a studio album since her 2005 album secret.

The album was released as CD and CD+2DVD. CD+2DVD was a limited release and carried the "Special Live "Dirty Ballroom" ~One Night Show~" concert she performed at Studio Coast in the Shin-Kiba district of Koto, Tokyo on October 23, 2008. The bonus secret feature on the second DVD could be accessed by clicking on the clown's nose on the menu screen, which was the rehearsals and setup for the show.

The first DVD carried six music videos, two of which were new and one, which was reedited for the album. The two new videos were "Just The Way You Are" (stylized as "JUST THE WAY YOU ARE") and "show girl." The reedited music video was the album version of "That Ain't Cool," which featured American singer Fergie – the original was released on her Moon EP. Bonus features on the first DVD included six secret videos, which could be accessed by clicking on Kumi's left eye on the menu screen.

A full version for the album's introduction was later performed during her Live Tour 2009 ~Trick~.

Editions
The album was released in only two editions: CD and CD+2DVD – a CD+DVD combo was never released.

CD: contained fourteen musical tracks.
CD+2DVD: contained fifteen musical tracks, six music videos and the concert DVD Special Live "Dirty Ballroom" ~One Night Show~.

The CD+2DVD also carried one bonus track on the CD: "Venus," originally released by Shocking Blue in 1969. Only limited editions of the CD only version carried this track.

Music videos
Two new videos were made for the album: "Just The Way You Are" and "show girl." There was also the album version of "That Ain't Cool" feat. Fergie," which carried more of a story compared to its single-released predecessor.

"show girl" carried a Moulin Rouge theme. "Just The Way You Are" was filmed at the Nasu Highland Park in the Tochigi Prefecture on the island of Honshu.

Promotion
"show girl" was used as the television commercial for music.jp.

"Your Love" was the promotional theme for Lixil Group's Tostem Group Home Finance.

"Venus" was used to advertise Gillette's Venus Breeze razor.

Commercial performance
Trick debuted at No. 1 on Oricon's Daily Chart with over 100,000 units sold in its first day. By the end of its first week, Trick sold over 253,000 copies, placing it at No. 1 on Oricon's Weekly Chart, being her third album to reach the top spot . However, it was one of Kumi's lowest first week sales for a studio album since her 2005 album secret.

Track listing

Chart ranking
Oricon Sales Chart (Japan)

 RIAJ Certification: Double Platinum

Album

Alternate Versions
show girl
show girl: Found on the album (2009)
show girl [DJ E-Man Big Show Remix]: Found on Koda Kumi Driving Hit's 5 (2013)

This is not a love song
This is not a love song: Found on the album (2009)
This is not a love song [KOZM Remix スグル・ヤマモト™]: Found on Koda Kumi Driving Hit's 3 (2011)

Driving
Driving: Found on the album and Koda Kumi Driving Hit's (2009)
Driving [GROOVE HACKER$ Remix]: Found on Koda Kumi Driving Hit's 2 (2010)
Driving [ID3 Night Drive Remix]: Found on Koda Kumi Driving Hit's 3 (2011)

Bling Bling Bling feat. AK-69
Bling Bling Bling feat. AK-69: Found on the album (2009)
Bling Bling Bling feat. AK-69 [Electro Rave Allstars Remix]: Found on Beach Mix (2012)

Ai no Kotoba
Ai no Kotoba: Found on the album (2009)
Ai no Kotoba [AILI's Warmy Remix]: Found on Koda Kumi Driving Hit's 5 (2013)

References

Koda Kumi albums
2009 albums
Japanese-language albums
Avex Group albums